The K League 1 (Hangul: K리그1) is the men's top professional football division of the South Korean football league system. The league is contested by twelve clubs.

History 

The South Korean professional football league was founded in 1983 as the "Korean Super League", with five member clubs. The initial five clubs were Hallelujah FC, Yukong Elephants, Pohang Steelworks, Daewoo Royals, Kookmin Bank. Hallelujah FC won the inaugural title, finishing one point ahead of Daewoo Royals to lift the crown.

The Super League was renamed the "Korean Professional Football League", and introduced the home and away system in 1987. It was once again renamed the "K League" in 1998. It had the current format by abolishing the K League Championship and the Korean League Cup after the 2011 season, and being split into two divisions in 2013. The first division was named the "K League Classic" while the newly created second division was named the "K League Challenge" and both are now part of the K League structure. Since its creation, the league has expanded from an initial 5 to 22 clubs. Of the five inaugural clubs, only Yukong, Pohang and Daewoo still compete in the K League; Kookmin Bank dropped out of the league at the end of 1984, and Hallelujah followed the season after.

On 22 January 2018 the official name was changed to "K League 1".

Structure 

On 5 October 2011, the league announced a plan to introduce a relegation system from the 2012 season, when two teams were relegated. In 2013, the bottom two teams were directly relegated, while the 12th team played a relegation playoff match against the winner of the newly formed K League Challenge. From the 2013 season, as the number of teams of K League was reduced, only the 12th team is automatically relegated, with the 11th team playing a match against the winner of the K League 2 promotion playoffs.

The league also introduced a split system like the Scottish Premier League in the 2012 season, where each club plays each other three times in the regular round, then the top and bottom six teams are split into Split A and Split B, in which a team plays every other team in the split once, to decide the final standings.

Other information 
The K League season typically begins around March and runs to late November each year. The number of games, clubs and the systems used have varied through the years.

A number of the member clubs are owned by South Korean major conglomerates "chaebols". Those clubs have adopted local city names in an effort to integrate themselves more with the local communities. All other teams are owned by local governments.

The K League champions, runners-up, and third-placed team gain entry to the AFC Champions League the following season, with the exception of Sangmu FC due to their unique status as a military team. If the winners of Korean FA Cup cannot qualify for the AFC Champions League or already qualified for it, fourth place also can participate.

In the 2009 season, Gangwon FC joined the K League as its 15th member club. As such, the K League had one or more clubs in every provinces of South Korea. This was the first time in domestic South Korean professional sports history that there has been at least one club in each province.

Current clubs

Champions

List of champions

Titles by club

Broadcasters

South Korea

Outside South Korea

See also 
K League records and statistics 
K League Championship
List of foreign K League 1 players

References

External links 

 
1
1983 establishments in South Korea
Korea Republic
Summer association football leagues
Sports leagues established in 1983
Professional sports leagues in South Korea